Jayaram is an Indian actor who acts predominantly in Malayalam, Tamil, and Telugu films. The list of films in which Jayaram played a leading role follows:

Malayalam Films

1980s

1990s

2000s

2010s

2020s

Other language films

Television

Dubbing artist

As playback singer

References

External links
 https://web.archive.org/web/20190506074929/http://jayaramonline.com/
 
 Official Website of Information and Public Relation Department of Kerala
 Jayaram at MSI
 Personal profile of Actor Jayaram 

Indian filmographies
Male actor filmographies